The 2022 Notre Dame Fighting Irish women's soccer team represented the University of Notre Dame during the 2022 NCAA Division I women's soccer season. It was the 35th season of the university fielding a program. The Fighting Irish were led by 5th year head coach Nate Norman and play their games at Alumni Stadium.

They finished 17–3–3 ovearll and 7–2–1 in ACC play to finish in third place.  As the third seed in the ACC Tournament, they tied Pittsburgh in the First around and advanced via penalty shoot-out 5–4.  In the Semifinal, Notre Dame played Florida State to a draw, but lost the penalty shoot-out to the eventual champions.  They received an at-large bid to the NCAA Tournament, where they were the first-seed in the Notre Dame Bracket.  They defeated  in the First Round, eight-seed  in the Second Round, and five-seed  in the Round of 16.  However, they fell 2–0 to ACC foe North Carolina in the Quarterfinals to end their season.  Their Quarterfinal performance was their best finish since 2010, when they won the NCAA title.

Previous season 

The Fighting Irish finished the season 14–6–2, 7–3–0 in ACC play to finish in fourth place.  As the fourth seed in the ACC Tournament, they lost to fifth seed Clemson in the First Round.  They received an at-large bid to the NCAA Tournament where they defeated SIU Edwardsville in the First Round, and Purdue on penalties in the Second Round, before losing to Arkansas in the Round of 16 to end their season.

Offseason

Departures

Incoming Transfers

Recruiting Class

Squad

Roster

Team management

Source:

Schedule
Source 

|-
!colspan=6 style=""| Exhibition

|-
!colspan=6 style=""| Non-Conference Regular Season

|-
!colspan=6 style=""| ACC Regular Season

|-
!colspan=6 style=";"| ACC Tournament

|-
!colspan=6 style=";"| NCAAA Tournament

Awards and honors

Rankings

2023 NWSL Draft

Source:

References

Notre Dame
Notre Dame
2021
Notre Dame women's soccer
Notre Dame